Ave Maria is a 1920 Italian silent film directed by Memmo Genua and Diana Karenne.

Plot
The story of an aristocratic mother who, having suffered from being unable to cross class boundaries, allows her daughter to marry a poor man.

Cast
 Ludovico Bendiner 
 Carmen Boni
 Romano Calò 
 Diana Karenne 
 Nicola Pescatori 
 Ernesto Treves
 Carlo Troisi - The Sword of Barbarossa(1921 film)

References

Bibliography
 Stewart, John. Italian film: a who's who. McFarland, 1994.

External links

1920 films
1920s Italian-language films
Italian silent feature films
Italian black-and-white films